Directorate General for Police (DGP) is the police organization of Northern Cyprus. It is part of the Security Forces Command.

History 
The roots of DGP goes back to Ottoman Police (1571). Two years after the transfer of administration of Cyprus to the United Kingdom in 1878, the Cyprus Military Police was founded. In 1936, the word "Military" was removed from the name and it became "Cyprus Police", which lasted until 1960. Following the independence of the Republic of Cyprus from the United Kingdom in 1960, organisation of policing was separated between the Cyprus Police and the Gendarme. In 1960, the Cyprus Police numbered 1019, with 604 Greek Cypriot and 415 Turkish Cypriot officers. The Cyprus Police Firearms Unit had 125 Greek Cypriots and 56 Turkish Cypriots out of a total 181 officers.

Between 1 April 1955 and 1974, the EOKA killed over 40 Turkish Cypriot policemen.

After the collapse of the partnership government in 1963, the Turkish Cypriot police and gendarmes formed the police organization "Directorate General for Police" (DGP). Following the Turkish Invasion of Cyprus in 1974, this then became Turkish Republic of Northern Cyprus Directorate General for Police (TRNC DGP).

TRNC Special Operation Department is police tactical unit of the TRNC DGP.

Police School 
Police School of Northern Cyprus is a member of International Association of Police Academies (INTERPA).

Branches 

 Administrative Police Department
 Directorate of Judicial Police
 Traffic Directorate
 Police School Directorate
 Immigration Directorate
 Administrative Affairs and Personnel Affairs Directorate
 Communication and Information Technologies Directorate
 Political Police Department
 Narcotics and Smuggling Prevention Directorate
 R&D Directorate
 Supervisory Board
 Financial Police
 Executive assistant
 Police band
 TRNC Special Operation Department

Directorates 
 Provincial Directorates
 Lefkosa Police Department
 Girne Police Department
 Güzelyurt Police Department
 İskele Police Department
 Famagusta Police Department

Ranks 
The General Directorate of Police uses the rank system consisting of nine classes.

Polis Genel Müdürlüğü bünyesinde çalışan sivil hizmet görevlileri ise dört dereceden oluşan rütbe sistemini kullanmaktadırlar.

References

External links 
 TRNC Directorate General for Police
 The cars of Northern Cyprus police

Law enforcement in Cyprus
Police